Rekdal is a surname and a location in Møre og Romsdal, Norway. Notable people with the surname include:

Anders Rekdal (born 1987), Norwegian freestyle skier
Kjetil Rekdal (born 1968), Norwegian footballer
Paisley Rekdal, American poet
Sindre Rekdal (born 1970), Norwegian football player